Live at Chastain Park is a live album recorded by James Brown in 1985 at the titular city park in Atlanta, Georgia. Originally released in the UK and Europe in 1988 by Charly Records, it has been reissued numerous times on budget labels. The concert was also filmed and has been issued on DVD by Charly (on the 2008 release Double Dynamite) and other companies. Maceo Parker is featured on saxophone.

In 2006 the Music Avenue label released a two-CD version of the album containing additional outtakes from the concert along with a selection of remixes.

Track listing

Personnel
James Brown – vocals
Ron Laster – guitar
Tony Jones – guitar
Jimmy Lee Moore – bass
Larry Moore – keyboards
Arthur Dickson – drums
Tony Cook – drums
Johnny Griggs – percussion, congas
Maceo Parker – alto saxophone
St. Clair Pinckney – tenor saxophone
Joe Collier – trumpet
George "Haji Ahkba" Dickerson – flugelhorn
Martha High – background vocals
"Sweet" Charles Sherrell – keyboards, band director

References

James Brown live albums
1988 live albums